Chikaskia Township, Kansas may refer to:

 Chikaskia Township, Kingman County, Kansas
 Chikaskia Township, Sumner County, Kansas

See also 
 List of Kansas townships

Kansas township disambiguation pages